Callum Robilliard Turner (born 15 February 1990) is a British actor and model. He is known for his roles as Theseus Scamander in Fantastic Beasts: The Crimes of Grindelwald and Fantastic Beasts: The Secrets of Dumbledore, Bill Rohan in Queen and Country, Eli in E4 series Glue and Shaun Emery in the BBC One television series The Capture.

For his performance in The Capture, Turner received a nomination for the BAFTA Television Award for Best Actor.

Early life
Turner was born on 15 February 1990 in Hammersmith and grew up in Chelsea, London. His middle name is after his mother's friend, poet David Robilliard, who died two years before Turner was born.

In an interview at the 2014 Cannes Film Festival, Turner said his mother instilled in him a love of film and inspired him to become an actor.

Career
Turner started his career in 2010, modelling for companies such as Next and Reebok, and in his first acting role for the short student film Think of England for the University of Hertfordshire Film and Television programme.

He starred as Tony in Zero, a 2011 film directed by David Barrouk and produced by Michael Riley. In 2012, he starred alongside Waterloo Road star Ben-Ryan Davies in the short film Human Beings, directed by Jonathan Entwistle.

He appeared in the French group The Shoes' 2012 music video "Time to Dance", with Jake Gyllenhaal.

In 2012, Turner was in the ITV series Leaving, alongside Helen McCrory. Turner's performance was met with mostly positive reviews.

In December 2012, Turner starred with Andrew Scott and Martin Clunes in another ITV Drama, The Town, portraying Ashley, a troubled teen.

In early 2013, Turner made a guest appearance in Showtime's historical-fiction drama television series, The Borgias as Calvino. He also starred in short film Alleycats as Eze, directed by Ian Bonhôte, and had a small role as Phillip in the second series of BBC One's Ripper Street.

In June 2012, Turner was cast in the lead role of John Boorman's film Queen and Country. Turner stated that Boorman revealed secret and personal events from his life, to help Turner to portray his character as best as he could.

In E4's whodunit series Glue in 2014, he portrayed Eli, a gypsy traveller, whose brother is murdered. 

In 2014, he received a Breakthrough Brits award from the British Academy Film Awards.

Turner portrayed Alistair in Paul McGuigan's 2015 horror film Victor Frankenstein.

He starred as Danny in the 2016 film Tramps, which premiered at the 2016 Toronto International Film Festival.

He portrayed Theseus Scamander in Fantastic Beasts: The Crimes of Grindelwald in 2018 and in Fantastic Beasts: The Secrets of Dumbledore in 2022.

He has a lead role as Shaun Emery in the 2019 BBC One mini-series The Capture.

In 2020, he portrayed Frank Churchill in the comedy-drama film Emma.

Filmography

Film

Television

Theatre

References

External links 

1990 births
Living people
21st-century English male actors
English male film actors
English male stage actors
English male television actors
Male actors from London
People from Chelsea, London
People from Hammersmith